The soundtrack to Trapped in the Closet (Chapters 1-12) was released on November 7, 2005 to accompany the film of the same name. The album was only released digitally and contains Chapters 1-5 of Trapped in the Closet as found on Kelly's seventh studio album TP.3 Reloaded, compiled together on one track, as well as seven new tracks in form of the chapters 6 to 12.

Track listing

Film soundtracks
Hip hop soundtracks
2005 soundtrack albums
Jive Records soundtracks
R. Kelly albums
Rhythm and blues soundtracks